The Foxconn suicides were a spate of suicides linked to low pay and brutal working conditions at the Foxconn City industrial park in Shenzhen, China, that occurred alongside several additional suicides at various other Foxconn-owned locations and facilities in mainland China. The series of suicides drew media attention, and employment practices at Foxconn—one of the world's largest contract electronics manufacturers—were investigated by several of its customers, including Apple and Hewlett-Packard (HP).

Events of suicide

Pre-2010
While 2010 was a notable year for the company in numbers of suicides; preceding years saw suicides being reported as well.

2010

2011

2012

Additionally, 150 Chinese workers threatened suicide in protest on 2 January 2012.

2013

2016
Eva Dou of The Wall Street Journal reported the suicide of a 31-year-old night shift worker at Foxconn's production building in Zhengzhou on 18 August 2016.

2018

Response

Foxconn clients
Apple issued a public statement about the suicides, and company spokesperson Steven Dowling said "[Apple is] saddened and upset by the recent suicides at Foxconn... A team from Apple is independently evaluating the steps they are taking to address these tragic events, and we will continue our ongoing inspections of the facilities where our products are made." The statement was released after the results from the company's probe into its suppliers' labor practices were published in early 2010. Foxconn was not specifically named in the report, but Apple suggested poor treatment of workers in facilities that manufacture its products may include violations of labor laws, violations of Apple's own rules for suppliers, and child labor (workers as young as 14 could legally work in China through special programs around the time this report was compiled).

Apple committed to the implementation of changes following the suicides, but in late 2014 news reports of labor issues at another factory of a Chinese supplier also surfaced.

Reports
The 2010 suicides prompted 20 Chinese universities to compile an 83-page report on Foxconn, which they described as a "labor camp". Interviews of 1,800 Foxconn workers at 12 factories found evidence of illegal overtime and failure to report accidents. The report also criticized Foxconn's management style, which it called inhumane and abusive. Additionally, long working hours, discrimination towards Mainland Chinese workers by their Taiwanese coworkers, and a lack of working relationships were all presented as potential problems in the university report.

A 2012 audit of Foxconn performed by the Fair Labor Association, at the request of Apple Inc., suggested that workplace accidents might be commonplace and that workers may consider overtime pay insufficient.

Crisis management 
During the first two and a half months, which included six of the fourteen deaths from suicide, Foxconn took a "no comment" approach to their business crisis. This left them vulnerable to media attacks, allowing the media to fill in their own information about the suicides. Li and Xu made a statement, in their case study about the business' suicides, that "Foxconn's series of employee suicides were severe events in the mind of the general public, and its 'no comment' strategy led to a more negative perception of its reputation and severe consequences." After the sixth suicide, Liu Kun, a spokesperson for Foxconn, stated that they were handling the crisis. He also started using a "denial strategy" to avoid any blame for the suicides and instead directed the fault at "the victims and societal problems."

One of the ways Foxconn started handling the crisis was to require that employees sign a waiver stating that Foxconn would not be made liable if any individuals were to commit suicide. This, however, caused more troubles for Foxconn and they eventually retracted the document. After they removed the waiver, they installed safety netting around the facility to prevent future suicides. Foxconn also implemented a pay raise from 950 yuan to 1200 yuan, but they in turn increased their quota by twenty percent as well. Lastly, Foxconn opened their doors to two-hundred journalists. Foxconn informed the writers that they were taking extra steps for the future; which included safety netting and more help hotlines for employees to be able to call.

Foxconn
The chairman of Foxconn, Terry Gou, made the following statement at a press conference focused on the controversy: "We are certainly not running a sweatshop. We are confident we'll be able to stabilize the situation soon. A manufacturing team of 800,000 people is very difficult to manage." At the time of the company's press conference, the factory complex where the deaths occurred employed up to 300,000 people.

In response to the suicides, Foxconn substantially increased wages for its Shenzhen factory workforce, installed suicide-prevention netting, brought in Buddhist monks to conduct prayer sessions and asked employees to sign no-suicide pledges. Workers were also required to sign a legally-binding document guaranteeing that they and their descendants would not sue the company as a result of unexpected death, self-injury or suicide.

Protests

In May 2010, the Students & Scholars Against Corporate Misbehaviour (SACOM) group held a protest in the lobby of Foxconn's Hong Kong headquarters. Around 25 protestors laid mannequins to rest and conducted funeral rites, while a spokesperson informed the media and onlookers: "We are staging the protest because of the high death rate [at Foxconn], with an abnormal number of workers committing suicide in the past five months". Activists from the Hong Kong Confederation of Trade Unions were also present and held signs that read "Foxconn lacks a conscience" and "Suicide is no accident". They also burned cardboard cutouts resembling iPhones.

The family of Ma Xianqian, one of the dead workers, protested outside the Foxconn factory. On 28 May 2010, demonstrators protested outside Hon Hai's Taipei headquarters laying flowers for those who had died at the Foxconn plant. Taiwanese unions and labor activists were also present at the Taipei protest and displayed banners that displayed Chinese text that translates into English as: "For wealth and power—physical and mental health spent, hopes lost" and "For profit of the brand—youth spent, dreams shattered".

On 8 June 2010, the date of Foxconn's Annual General Meeting, student protesters from SACOM, Hong Kong labor unions and rights groups demonstrated outside a Hong Kong Apple store.

A small group of young organizers picketed at an Apple store in San Francisco on 17 June 2010. The protesters carried placards showing the names and ages of the dead workers.

Analysis

ABC News and The Economist both conducted comparisons and found that although the number of workplace suicides at Foxconn was large in absolute terms, the suicide rate was actually lower than the overall suicide rate of China or the United States. According to a 2011 Centers for Disease Control and Prevention report, China had a high suicide rate with approximately 22.23 deaths per 100,000 persons. In 2010, the company's employee count was a reported 930,000 people.

Labor activists stated the suicides supported their assertion that numerous labor abuses take place at Foxconn. Economic conditions external to the company also might have been influential; during the same year, several major strike actions at other high-profile manufacturers occurred in China, and the Lewis turning-point is a macro-economic factor that might provide context for the events. If the above factors are true, it shows that there could be inconsistency between Foxconn's labor conditions and any progress in China's economy.

However, one expert claimed that employees were treated comparatively well at Foxconn. Boy Lüthje, of Germany's Institute of Social Research, told The Economist that the company pays a minimum monthly wage of 900 yuan (US$130) as well as providing free recreational facilities, food, and lodging for employees at some of its factory complexes. Overtime, however, may be routinely demanded.

See also
 Labor relations in China
 2010 Chinese labour unrest
 France Télécom staff suicides
 Suicide in the People's Republic of China
 Xu Lizhi

References

External links 
 Sacom.hk Workers as Machines: Military Management in Foxconn. Report from Hong Kong-based non-profit Students & Scholars Against Corporate Misbehaviour (SACOM)
 Deconstructing Foxconn video from Chinese University of Hong Kong professor Jack Qiu
 1 Million Workers. 90 Million iPhones. 17 Suicides. Who’s to Blame? March 2011 cover story of Wired magazine

Foxconn people
Suicides in the People's Republic of China
2010 in China
2011 in China
Lists of Chinese people
2012 in China
Lists of deaths in 2011
2013 in China
Lists of deaths in 2010
Lists of deaths in 2012
Lists of deaths in 2016
2016 in China
Lists of deaths in 2013